Anthropophagous 2000 is a 1999 German horror film directed by Andreas Schnaas and written by Karl-Heinz Geisendorf. It is a remake of the 1980 film Antropophagus.

Plot 
Three Interpol agents meet at a cave where several corpses have been uncovered. While the other agents go for backup, Steven Bauers investigates the cavern, finding a journal under one of the bodies. Bauers skims through the journal, which tells the story of Nikos Karamanlis, beginning with him lost at sea with his daughter and pregnant wife.

The film then shows a couple, Mary and Stuart, camping on a beach, where they are murdered by Nikos. At a train station, Mary and Stuart's friends (Vincent, Marc, Caroll, Rita and Georg) head to a vacation home in Borgo San Lorenzo, where they expect to rendezvous Mary, Stuart and Caroll's husband Stan (who is preoccupied with work). The quintet reach the outskirts of Borgo San Lorenzo, where their RV breaks down. Georg, Rita and Marc go ahead (finding the village full of bodies and abandoned except for an elusive woman in black) while Vincent stays with Caroll, who had twisted her ankle. Nikos kills Vincent, abducts Caroll, moves the RV, and disposes of two nearby campers, Hank and Allan.

Georg, Rita and Marc take shelter in the vacation home, where they find Mary's blind sister, Auriet, hiding in the basement. The next day, the group reach the Karamanlis estate, where Nikos's sister Irena (the woman in black) commits suicide by leaping out a window. Inside the house, Georg finds more bodies and Nikos's journal, which he reads as Marc wanders off, running into Stan. They search for Caroll and Vincent, but Marc falls behind and is impaled on a stake by Nikos. Stan finds Caroll in the cave, and they are confronted by Nikos, who flashes back to accidentally killing his wife (during an argument over whether they should eat their dead daughter) while lost at sea. With his wife dead, Nikos ate her and their daughter to survive. After recollecting, Nikos impales Stan through the head with a machete, and cuts out and eats Caroll's unborn child.

Realizing Marc is gone, Georg, Rita and Auriet look for him, with Auriet being killed by Nikos when she becomes separated from the others. After hours of wandering, Georg and Rita are ambushed by Nikos, who rips Rita's head off. Georg shoots Nikos several times, prompting Nikos to reach into the wounds, rip some of his own innards out, and gnaw on them. Despite the severity of his injuries, Nikos continues to attack Georg and tries to drown him in a pool, but becomes distracted when he hears his wife's voice. Georg gains the upper hand, and beheads Nikos with a shovel, at Nikos's own insistence.

In the present, Bauers ponders how the journal got into the cave, and how it could be so thorough. As he exits the cave, Bauers finds what appears to be Georg's cell phone, and has his head shot off by an unseen assailant.

Cast

Reception 
Sean Leonard from HorrorNews.net criticized the film's dialogue, plot holes, limited acting, and poor technical aspects. Leonard concluded his review by writing, "Anthropophagous 2000 is not going to change the world of film, or even the world of horror. But, much like Goblet of Gore, it is non-stop splatter and gore and non-stop fun. The more I see of Schnaas’ work, the more excited I am to see more. His movies remind me of how much fun it is to go to a video store and pick out titles based solely on how disgusting the stills are on the back of the box." 
The Worldwide Celluloid Massacre called the film "plodding" and "upgrades the splatter by several buckets but keeps the ultimate boredom" and categorized it as worthless. Slasherpool stated the film was "a disgrace to the original" in its review of Antropophagus.

Film Bizarro praised the gore, special effects and said it was well-shot for a film of its caliber, but also that it was uncreative, and lacked the suspenseful atmosphere of its predecessor.

Cult Reviews responded positively to Anthropophagous 2000, the site's only criticisms being that it was hindered by being shot-on-video and that Andreas Schnaas lacked the directorial skill of Joe D'Amato.

References

External links 
 
 Official website as archived February 9, 2007

1999 films
German slasher films
German splatter films
1999 horror films
Films set in Italy
Films shot in Italy
1990s slasher films
Horror film remakes
Remakes of Italian films
Films set in Germany
Films shot in Austria
Films shot in Athens
1990s German-language films
Films directed by Andreas Schnaas
Films about cannibalism
1990s German films